Dermatologic Surgery is a monthly peer-reviewed journal that deals with the subject matter of dermatology. The journal is published by American Society for Dermatologic Surgery, Lippincott, Williams & Wilkins
According to the Journal Citation Reports, the journal has a 2020 impact factor of 3.398.

References

External links

Dermatology journals
Surgery journals